Everett Lewis is an American independent filmmaker whose directorial credits include: The Natural History of Parking Lots (Sundance 1990), An Ambush of Ghosts (Sundance 1992), Skin & Bone (Toronto 1994), Luster (Outfest 2000), FAQs (Philadelphia 2002), Lucky Bastard (Outfest 2008), The Pretty Boys (2011), Somefarwhere (2011, premiered at the Paris Gay and Lesbian Film Festival Cheries Cherie), and Territory (2016).

Lewis earned a Bachelor of Arts degree from North Carolina State University and a Master of Fine Arts from the University of Southern California. He has served on the faculty or as a guest lecturer of a number of colleges and universities, including the University of Southern California School of Cinematic Arts, Chapman College and Long Beach City College.

Filmography

Notes

External links
 Official site 

 Everett Lewis interview

Year of birth missing (living people)
American film directors
American male screenwriters
American film editors
Chapman University faculty
LGBT film directors
American LGBT screenwriters
Living people
North Carolina State University alumni
Screenwriters from California
University of Southern California alumni